Padmini Priyadarshini (later Padmini Ramachandran) was an Indian actor, dancer and choreographer. She acted in supporting roles during the 1950s and 1960s in Tamil, Kannada and Hindi films. She established a dancing school in Bangalore named Natya Priya and trained students in dancing. In 2013, she received Shantala Natya Sri Award from Karnataka Government.

Personal life
Born in Mavelikkara, Kerala, she was brought up in Chennai. She learned dancing from Vazhuvoor B. Ramaiyah Pillai. Padmini Priyadarshini was married to Ramachandran from Thalassery and the couple had 3 sons and 1 daughter.

Career
She established a dancing school in Bangalore. She has performed dance concerts with her students in countries like United Kingdom and United States. She was appointed as its Head when Karnataka government formed the 'Education Board'.

Notable films 

 Sahodhari (1959)
Paadha Kaanikkai (1962)
 Life of Pi (2012)

Partial filmography 
(in Alphabetical order)

English and French
 Life of Pi (film)

Hindi 
 Dil Hi To Hai
 Do Behnen (1959)

Kannada 
 Bettada Kalla
 Bhakta Markandeya
 Jagajyothi Basveshwara
 Rayara Sose

Tamil 
 Annaiyin Aanai (Dancer)
 Baghdad Thirudan
 Bhaktha Markandeya (Dancer - Pazhanimalaiyaanai)
 Deiva Balam
 Iru Sagodharigal (Dancer)
 Iruvar Ullam
 Kuravanji (Dancer)
 Maalaiyitta Mangai
 Nenjam Marappathillai 
 Paadha Kaanikkai
 Petra Manam
 Rathinapuri Ilavarasi
 Sahodhari
 Thamarai Kulam
 Then Nilavu
 Vidivelli
 Bhaaga Pirivinai

Telugu 
 Kalasi Vunte Kaladu Sukham (Dancer)
 Nartanasala (Urvashi)

References 

Actresses in Kannada cinema
Kannada actresses
Actresses in Tamil cinema
Indian film actresses
20th-century Indian actresses
Actresses in Hindi cinema